Aleksey Alekseyevich Arkhipov (born 24 March 1983) is a former Russian footballer.

References

1983 births
Living people
Russian footballers
Association football midfielders
FC Dynamo Moscow players
FC Luch Vladivostok players
Russian Premier League players
FC Shinnik Yaroslavl players
FC Krasnodar players
Footballers from Moscow
FC Vityaz Podolsk players